Minor league baseball teams were based in Boston, Massachusetts between 1884 and 1893. The Boston Blues (1886–1887) and Boston Reds (1893) played as members of the New England League. Earlier, the Boston Reserves played as members of the Massachusetts State Association in 1884 and may have been the first true farm team. The Boston minor league teams shared the city with the Boston major league teams. The 1893 Boston Reds were the final minor league team hosted in Boston.

History
The 1884 Boston Reserves were the first minor league baseball team to play in Boston, Massachusetts. The Reserves were owned and operated by the Boston Beaneaters of the National League and may have been the first true baseball farm team. The Boston Reserves played as charter members of the eight–team Massachusetts State Association, which played one or two games per week in its only season of play. The Boston Reserves of the Massachusetts State Association ended the 1884 season with a record of 13–8, finishing 2nd in the Massachusetts State Association, 1.0 games behind 1st place Springfield. John Morrill and S.R. Brown served as managers. The Boston Reserves played in the league alongside Holyoke (7–11), Lawrence (7–15), Lynn (4–8), Salem (2–11), Springfield (12–5), Waltham (9–6) and Worcester (11–4).

In 1886, Boston fielded another minor league team, as the Boston Blues became members of the New England League. The Blues finished the 1886 season with a record of 35–63, placing 6th and last in the New England League under managers Walter Burnham and Tim Murnane. The Boston Blues finished in the New England League standings with Brockton (45–56), Haverhill (59–38), Lawrence (42–55), Newburyport Clamdiggers/Lynn (53–52) and Portland (66–36). The Blues their played home games at South End Grounds.

The Boston Blues returned to play in the 1887 New England League, but relocated during the season. The Boston Blues had a 35–18 record when the franchise moved to Haverhill, Massachusetts on July 11, 1887. The Boston/Haverhill Blues ended the 1887 New England League season with a record of 47–36, placing 3rd in the eight–team New England League, finishing 13.5 games behind the 1st place Lowell Blues. Walter Burnham was the manager.

In 1893, Boston returned briefly to the New England League, playing as the Boston Reds. The Lowell team had a 14–20 record when the franchise relocated to Manchester on June 26, 1893. The team was 3–13 in Manchester when Manchester relocated the franchise to Boston on July 16, 1893, to finish the season. The Lowell/Manchester/Boston Reds finished the 1893 season with an overall record of 29–55, placing last in the six–team in the New England League, finishing 28.0 games behind the 1st place Fall River Indians. Bill McGunnigle and Thomas H. O'Brien served as managers of the Lowell/Manchester/Boston team.

The 1893 Boston Reds did not return to the New England League the next season and were the last minor league team to be based in Boston. The Boston Blues moniker was revived in 1946 by the Boston Blues team, a Negro league baseball franchise, which played as members of the United States League.

The ballpark
The Boston Blues and Boston Reds teams reportedly played home games at the South End Grounds. Located at Gainsborough Street, Huntington Avenue, Walpole Street and Columbus Avenue in Boston, the South End Grounds was the home to the National League Boston Braves. The ballpark had  dimensions of (Left, Center, Right): 250–450–255. The original South End Grounds grandstand burnt down in 1894 and was immediately rebuilt. Overall, baseball was played at South End Grounds for 43 seasons.

Timeline

Notable alumni

John Ake (1886)
Marty Barrett (1884)
Dick Burns (1886)
Kid Butler (1886)
Charlie Cady (1886)
John Connor (1884)
Jim Cudworth (1893)
Fred Doe (1887)
Ed Dugan (1887)
Howard Earl (1886)
Dennis Fitzgerald (1886)
Ed Flanagan (1887)
Gid Gardner (1887)
Chummy Gray (1893)
Tom Gunning (1884)
Pat Hartnett (1886)
Bill Hawes (1893)
Mike Hines (1884)
Jerry Hurley (1884)
Mike Jordan (1887)
John Kiley (1886)
Dan Lally (1887)
Dan Mahoney (1887)
Jack Manning (1887)
Jim Manning (1884)
Pat McCauley (1893)
Jerry McCormick (1886)
Bill McGunnigle (1893, MGR)
Frank McLaughlin (1886)
William McLaughlin (1886)
Gene Moriarty (1884)
George Moolic (1887)
Henry Mullin (1886)
Morgan Murphy (1886-1887)
Willie Murphy (1886)
Cyclone Ryan (1886)
Edgar Smith (1887)
Tom Smith (1893)
Marty Sullivan (1886)
Gene Vadeboncoeur (1886)
George Wetzel (1886)
Art Whitney (1893)

See also
Boston Blues playersBoston Reds (minor league) playersBoston Reserves players

References

External links
Boston - Baseball Reference

Baseball in Boston